Mitsunori (written: , , , ,  or ) is a masculine Japanese given name. Notable people with the name include:

, Japanese footballer
, Japanese artist
, Japanese shogi player
, Japanese computer scientist
, Japanese politician
, Japanese footballer
, Japanese footballer
, Japanese footballer

See also 

 Mitsunari

Japanese masculine given names